Erik Thomas Enström (born March 3, 1989 in Örnsköldsvik) is a Swedish former professional ice hockey player. He is the younger brother of Tobias Enström and played in the Swedish Hockey League for Modo Hockey and Örebro HK.

References

External links

1989 births
Living people
IF Björklöven players
People from Örnsköldsvik Municipality
Modo Hockey players
Örebro HK players
Swedish ice hockey forwards
Sportspeople from Västernorrland County
21st-century Swedish people